Princess Tsehai Haile Selassie (13 October 1919 – 17 August 1942) was the third daughter and fourth child of Emperor Haile Selassie and Empress Menen Asfaw of Ethiopia. Deaths in childbirth

Biography
Princess Tsehai was born in Addis Ababa. She often accompanied the Emperor to public events during his exile in Great Britain (1936–1941), where she trained as a nurse at London's Great Ormond Street Hospital for Sick Children. She graduated as a state registered children's nurse on 25 August 1939. After the restoration of her father in 1941, she married Lieutenant-General (later Brigadier-General) Lij Abiye Abebe, and moved with him to Welega Province when he was appointed governor there.

She later worked at Dessie Hospital in Ethiopia.

Princess Tsehai died in Nekemte on 17 August 1942, from complications during childbirth. Her baby did not survive. She was buried in the crypt of the Ba'eta Le Mariam Monastery in Addis Ababa that had been built as the mausoleum church of Emperor Menelik II.

Emperor Haile Selassie founded the Princess Tsehai Memorial Hospital in her memory, which also served as a nursing school. After the 1974 revolution, the hospital was renamed the Armed Forces General Hospital.

Patronages 
 Honorary President of the Association for the Benefit of Ethiopian Women (1935–1942).

Honours

National honours 
 Knight Grand Cordon with Collar of the Order of the Queen of Sheba (1930).
 Imperial Coronation Medal (1930).

Ancestry

Notes

External links

Ethiopian princesses
Ethiopian nurses
1919 births
1942 deaths
Haile Selassie
Daughters of emperors
Ethiopian expatriates in the United Kingdom
Recipients of orders, decorations, and medals of Ethiopia